Enrique de la Fuente Santos (born August 11, 1975) is a Spanish volleyball player, a member of Spain men's national volleyball team, a participant of the Olympic Games Sydney 2000, European Champion 2007, a medalist of the European League (gold in 2007, bronze in 2005).

Personal life
He was born in Vigo, Spain. His wife is French-Polish volleyball player Kinga Maculewicz-De La Fuente.

Career
In 2010-2011 he played for Polish club Lotos Trefl Gdańsk.

Sporting achievements

National team
 1995  Universiade
 2005  European League
 2007  European League
 2007  CEV European Championship

References

1975 births
Living people
Sportspeople from Vigo
Spanish men's volleyball players
Volleyball players at the 2000 Summer Olympics
Olympic volleyball players of Spain
Spanish expatriate sportspeople in France
Expatriate volleyball players in France
Spanish expatriate sportspeople in Italy
Expatriate volleyball players in Italy
Spanish expatriate sportspeople in Turkey
Expatriate volleyball players in Turkey
Spanish expatriate sportspeople in Poland
Expatriate volleyball players in Poland
Galatasaray S.K. (men's volleyball) players
Arkas Spor volleyball players
Trefl Gdańsk players
Universiade medalists in volleyball
Universiade silver medalists for Spain
Medalists at the 1995 Summer Universiade